This is a partial discography of Gilbert and Sullivan's opera The Pirates of Penzance, which premiered on 31 December 1879, at the Fifth Avenue Theatre in New York City.

For a more complete discography up to 2009, see Marc Shepherd's discography at the Gilbert and Sullivan archive.

References

Pirates of Penzance, The